German Bobsleigh, Luge, and Skeleton Federation (BSD) is the official federation for bobsleigh, luge and skeleton in Germany. It is the German representative both to the International Bobsleigh and Tobogganing Federation and the International Luge Federation and is part of the German Olympic Committee.

Until German reunification in 1990, East Germany operated its own governing body for bobsleigh and luge sports, the Deutscher Schlitten- und Bobsportverband.

BSD is headquartered in Berchtesgaden.

References
Official website 

Sledding in Germany
Germany at the Olympics
Bobsleigh